Joseph Dawson Willis (21 April 1896 – 10 August 1953) was a Scottish footballer who played for Dumbarton, Bo'ness, East Fife and Kilmarnock.

References

1896 births
1953 deaths
Scottish footballers
Dumbarton F.C. players
East Fife F.C. players
Kilmarnock F.C. players
Bo'ness F.C. players
Scottish Football League players
Association football defenders